Mansmann is a surname. Notable people with the surname include:

 Carol Los Mansmann (1942–2002), United States circuit judge
 Till Mansmann (born 1968), German politician